The Three Eras is a Judeo-Christian scheme of periodization in historiography, called also  Vaticinium Eliae (prophecy of Elijah or Elias). A three-period division of time appears in the Babylonian Talmud: the period before the giving of the law (Torah); the period subject to the law; and the period of the Messiah. This scheme was later adapted to Christian use, with three periods corresponding to the persons of the Trinity. In that form it was taken up by Joachim of Fiore; it had been held in a similar form a little earlier by the Amalricians.

After the Protestant Reformation the scheme of the "prophecy of Elias" was popularised by Philip Melanchthon and his Lutheran collaborators, using Carion's Chronicle as a vehicle, heavily edited into due form. The three periods were 'without the law', 'under law', and 'under grace'. With each period attributed a length of two millennia, the scheme was applied to predict the end of time (or at least the commencement of a final seventh millennium). This was done by Johann Heinrich Alsted in the 17th century. The scheme was widely influential in its tripartite structure, seen also in the chronology of Achilles Pirmin Gasser.

See also
Six Ages of the World
Joachim of Fiore#Theory of the three ages

Notes

Judeo-Christian topics
Christian philosophy